Bruno da Silva Barbosa (born 15 February 1988), known as Bruno Silva, is a Brazilian footballer who plays for Novorizontino. Mainly a defensive midfielder, he can also play as a centre back.

Career
Bruno left Gabala in January 2013, returning to Brazil with Atlético Ibirama.

On 5 March 2014, Novo Hamburgo cancelled Bruno's contract with immediate effect.

Silva joined Guarani FC on 10 June 2019.

Career statistics

Honours
São Paulo
Campeonato Brasileiro Série A: 2008

References

External links

1988 births
Living people
People from Sorocaba
Brazilian footballers
Association football defenders
Association football midfielders
Association football utility players
São Paulo FC players
Clube Atlético Hermann Aichinger players
Esporte Clube Novo Hamburgo players
Clube Náutico Marcílio Dias players
Grêmio Osasco Audax Esporte Clube players
Oeste Futebol Clube players
Santa Cruz Futebol Clube players
Associação Ferroviária de Esportes players
CR Vasco da Gama players
Gabala FC players
Guarani FC players
Campeonato Brasileiro Série A players
Campeonato Brasileiro Série B players
Campeonato Brasileiro Série C players
Azerbaijan Premier League players
Brazilian expatriate footballers
Brazilian expatriate sportspeople in Azerbaijan
Expatriate footballers in Azerbaijan
Footballers from São Paulo (state)